Cain House may refer to:

Cain House (Dayton, Oregon), listed on the NRHP in Oregon
Cain House (St. Marys, West Virginia), listed on the NRHP in West Virginia